Monastyrskaya Pashnya is a rural locality (a village) in Telegovskoye Rural Settlement, Krasnoborsky District, Arkhangelsk Oblast, Russia. The population was 213 as of 2010.

Geography 
Monastyrskaya Pashnya is located 13 km southeast of Krasnoborsk (the district's administrative centre) by road. Zapolye is the nearest rural locality.

References 

Rural localities in Krasnoborsky District